N9 may refer to:

Roads
 N9 road (Belgium), a road connecting Brussels and Ostend, passing Aalst, Ghent, Eeklo and Bruges (see :nl:N9 (België))
 N9 road (France) 
 N9 road (Ireland)
 N9 road (Netherlands), a road connecting Alkmaar and De Kooy
 N9 road (South Africa), a road connecting George and Colesberg
 N9 road (Switzerland)
 Nebraska Highway 9, a state highway in the U.S. state of Nebraska

Other
 Fairey N.9, a British seaplane
 Jero N° 9 Antwerpen 1911, a 1911 aeroplane 
 London Buses route N9
 N9, a postcode district in the N postcode area
 N9, the Nokia N9 model N9-00, a MeeGo Linux phone
 Negeri Sembilan, one of the 13 states in Malaysia
 Netscape Navigator 9, a web browser created by Netscape Communications
 Nonoxynol-9, a molecule
 North Coast Aviation IATA airline designator
Northrop N-9, company designation of the Northrop YB-35 flying wing bomber
Northrop N-9M, research aircraft, built as a flying mockup of the Northrop YB-35
 LNER Class N9, a class of British steam locomotives

See also
 N°9, a shortening for Number nine

 9N (disambiguation)